Anagadi is a village in Belgaum district in the southern state of Karnataka, India. The official spoken languages of this region is Marathi.

Anagadi Pin code is 591120 and postal head office is Nandgad.
Gunji ( 11 km ), Londa ( 13 km ), Chapagaon ( 13 km ), Mangenkopp ( 14 km ), Lokoli ( 15 km ) are the nearby Villages to Anagadi.

References

5."Census 2001 Population Finder: Karnataka: Belgaum: Khanapur: Khanapur". Office of The Registrar General & Census Commissioner, Ministry of Home Affairs, Government of India. Archived from the original on 16 May 2013.

6."NPR Report: Karnataka: Belgaum: Khanapur". National Population Register, Ministry of Home Affairs, Government of India. 2011.

Villages in Belagavi district